Gertrud Haldimann (1907–2001), was a Swiss opponent of women's suffrage in Switzerland. 

Haldimann was the co-founder of the Frauenkomitees gegen die Einführung des Frauenstimmrechts in der Schweiz (English: Women's Committee against the introduction of women's suffrage in Switzerland) in 1958.  She was also the chairperson of the Bund der Schweizerinnen gegen das Frauenstimmrecht (English: Federation of Swiss women against women's suffrage) from 1959 until 1971, when suffrage was granted.

Notes

1907 births
2001 deaths
Swiss activists
Swiss women activists
Anti-suffragists